Zhang Hua (born 18 October 1990) is a Chinese taekwondo practitioner. 

She won a silver medal in lightweight at the 2009 World Taekwondo Championships, after being defeated by Lim Su-jeong in the final. She won gold medals at the 2012 and 2014 Asian Taekwondo Championships, and a silver medal at the 2014 Asian Games.

References

External links

1990 births
Living people
Chinese female taekwondo practitioners
Taekwondo practitioners at the 2014 Asian Games
Asian Games medalists in taekwondo
Medalists at the 2014 Asian Games
Asian Games silver medalists for China
World Taekwondo Championships medalists
Asian Taekwondo Championships medalists
21st-century Chinese women